Daniel J. Hurley was an American football player and doctor. He played college football at the halfback position for the Harvard Crimson football team and was selected as a consensus All-American in 1904 and 1905. He was team captain for two years. Hurley was once badly injured, suffering a blood clot in the brain.

Hurley graduated from Harvard Medical School in 1909 and interned at Boston City Hospital and Lying-In Hospital. From 1913 to 1916 he practiced in Charlestown and was the assistant physician at the Charlestown State Prison. From 1916 to 1917 he studied tuberculosis at the Trudeau Sanatorium. From 1918 to 1919 he was a captain in the United States Army. In 1919 he began practicing in Boston. From 1923 to 1931 he was a surgical specialist with the United States Veterans' Bureau. From 1931 to 1938 he was a member of the state board of registration in medicine.

References

Year of death missing
20th-century American physicians
All-American college football players
American football halfbacks
Boston Latin School alumni
Harvard Crimson football players
Harvard Medical School alumni
People from Charlestown, Boston
Players of American football from Boston
United States Army personnel of World War I
1881 births